Heteropsis elisi, the western patroller, is a butterfly in the family Nymphalidae. It is found in Guinea, Sierra Leone, Ivory Coast, Ghana, Togo and Tanzania. The nominate subspecies is found in dense Guinea savanna and the margins of semi-deciduous forest.  Subspecies H. e. uluguru is found in open grassland and shrubs at altitudes between 1,000 and 1,400 meters.

Subspecies
Heteropsis elisi elisi (Guinea, Sierra Leone, Ivory Coast, Ghana, Togo)
Heteropsis elisi tanzanica (Kielland, 1994) (Tanzania: Bondwa Mountain)
Heteropsis elisi uluguru (Kielland, 1990) (Tanzania: east to the Uluguru Mountains)

References

Elymniini
Butterflies described in 1893
Butterflies of Africa